Simon Wilton Phipps MC (1921–2001) was a British Anglican bishop, who served as Bishop of Lincoln between 1974 and 1987.

Life
He was born on 6 July 1921, the son of Captain William Duncan Phipps R.N. and Pamela Ross, and was educated at Eton and Trinity College, Cambridge.

In 1940, he was commissioned into the Coldstream Guards. He fought both in North Africa, where he was wounded, and in Italy. On 19 April 1945, in the Allied advance to the River Po, he was again wounded during a reconnaissance mission and was subsequently awarded the Military Cross (MC). He reached the rank of major, before being demobilised in 1946.

Following the war, having read History at Trinity, he studied for the priesthood at Westcott House, Cambridge. A talented writer of lyrics, he was President of Footlights in 1949.

In 1953, after a short spell as a curate in Huddersfield, Phipps was appointed Chaplain at Trinity. That appointment was followed by ten years at Coventry as an Industrial Chaplain, during which time he lived in a small council flat on a new housing estate. The modesty of his surroundings did not prevent him from entertaining his long-time friend, Princess Margaret, "to the great interest of his neighbours". His time in Coventry is generally thought to have formed one of the personally happiest periods of his ministry.

In 1968 Phipps was appointed as Suffragan Bishop of Horsham, before being translated to Lincoln in 1974, where he served as Bishop until 1987.

Phipps died in January 2001. In 1973, he had married Mary Welch, who died in 2000. They had no children. On his death, The Times recorded that Phipps had combined gentleness, tranquillity and sweetness of character with deep psychological insight and considerable strength of purpose.

Sources

Daily Telegraph obituary
 Caroline Gilmour and Patricia Wyndham, Simon Phipps: A Portrait (Continuum, 2003)

Alumni of Trinity College, Cambridge
Bishops of Lincoln
Bishops of Horsham
20th-century Church of England bishops
Coldstream Guards officers
Recipients of the Military Cross
British Army personnel of World War II
People educated at Eton College
2001 deaths
1921 births